Maxville Aerodrome  is located  northeast of Maxville, Ontario, Canada.

References

Registered aerodromes in Ontario